The ruins of St. Edmund's Chapel are located in a field to the east of the village of Lyng in the English county of Norfolk. It was one of two religious buildings in Lyng, the other being St. Margaret's Church.

The chapel was part of a Benedictine nunnery, purportedly founded to commemorate a battle with the Danes during their 9th century campaign which would end with the death of Edmund the Martyr. The nunnery was transferred to Thetford in 1176. The chapel was not abandoned until at least 1250, and a fair was held on the site by the Prioress of St. George's Priory, Thetford in 1287. A lawsuit is recorded in 1438 between the prioress and the rector of Lyng, after which date the land was transferred to the village church.

There is a reference to the chapel in the Bodleian MS 240. This dates from the 1370s, when in the space of five years there were seven miracles connected with the chapel. These mostly involved incidents in the surrounding villages, such as Bylaugh, Scarning and Sparham, but one involved a man from Kent whose wife was cured of paralysis. 

The chapel was in ruins by 1730. The brickwork in the remaining ruins is probably fifteenth century in date, and it is possible that the site remained in use until the Reformation, possibly as a chapel of ease for the hamlet of Lyng Eastaugh to the east. The ruins of the chapel which remain are described as "fragmentary" although Nikolaus Pevsner recorded a surviving arch during the 1950s, possibly the north doorway. Only part of the arch remains, and the ruins are largely obscured by vegetation. Objects ranging from Roman to post-medieval in date have been found on the site. During the 19th century human skeletons were found between the chapel and the road to the south.

References in folklore

A newspaper article from 1939 records a tradition concerning the chapel. It was said that it was founded for the nuns to pray for the souls of those killed in a battle between the Danes and King Edmund's Anglo-Saxons which may have occurred near to the site of the chapel. The Grove, an area of woodland, which appears on maps from the 18th century as King's Grove, lies to the south of the chapel. An "ancient" hollow way runs through the wood connecting the hamlet of Collen's Green to the road. A boulder known as the Great Stone of Lyng – a glacial erratic of conglomerate stone, left in the moraine of a retreating glacier - lies alongside the track. The stone is about 2 metres long by 1 metre wide and has been associated in folklore with "druids, devils, sounds, the stone moving or growing, burials and treasure" as well as the stone bleeding "if pricked with a pin".

When the nuns left Lyng in the twelfth century they retained the income derived from holding the annual fair on 20 November (St Edmund's day). This fair long outlived the nunnery; it survived into the last quarter of the nineteenth century and is mentioned in Parson Woodforde's diary.  There was also a guild of St Edmund in the village.

Sources
 Brooks, Pamela, n.d.: Norfolk Ghosts and Legends 

Ruins in Norfolk
Churches in Norfolk